Bryotypella leucosticta is a moth of the family Noctuidae. It is found in India (Darjeeling).

References

Moths described in 1882
Xyleninae